Dobra may refer to:

People
 Alexandru Dobra (1794–1870), Romanian Greek Catholic hierarch
 Anica Dobra (born 1963), Serbian actress and singer
 Armando Dobra (born 2001), British football player
 Rifo Dobra (born 1952), Albanian photographer from Kosovo
 Kaan Dobra (born 1972), former Polish professional footballer and assistant manager at Beşiktaş

Places

Croatia 
 Dobro (Istria), in the hamlet-port Koromačno

Czech Republic 
 Dobrá, Frýdek-Místek, Moravian-Silesian Region

India 
 Dobra, Bhopal, Madhya Pradesh
 Dobra, Rajasthan

Poland 
 Dobra, Poznań County, Greater Poland Voivodeship
 Dobra, Turek County, Greater Poland Voivodeship
 Dobra, Lesser Poland Voivodeship
 Dobra, Łask County, Łódź Voivodeship
 Dobra, Zgierz County, Łódź Voivodeship
 Dobra, Bolesławiec County, Lower Silesian Voivodeship
 Dobra, Oleśnica County, Lower Silesian Voivodeship
 Dobra, Lubusz Voivodeship
 Dobra, Masovian Voivodeship
 Dobra, Opole Voivodeship
 Dobra, Pomeranian Voivodeship
 Dobra, Przeworsk County, Subcarpathian Voivodeship
 Dobra, Sanok County, Subcarpathian Voivodeship
 Dobra, Silesian Voivodeship
 Dobra, Świętokrzyskie Voivodeship
 Dobra, Łobez County, West Pomeranian Voivodeship
 Dobra, Police County, West Pomeranian Voivodeship

Romania 
 Dobra, Dâmbovița
 Dobra, Hunedoara
 Dobra, a village in Șugag, Alba County
 Dobra, a village in Bălăcița, Mehedinţi County
 Dobra, a village in Papiu Ilarian, Mureș County
 Dobra, a village in Supur, Satu Mare County

Serbia 
 Dobra (Golubac)

Slovakia 
 Dobrá, Trebišov District, Košice Region

United States 
 Dobra, West Virginia

Rivers 
 Dobra (Kupa), a river in central Croatia
 Dobra (Sella), a river in the Amieva district of Asturias, Spain
 Dobra (Mureș), a river in Hunedoara County, Romania
 Dobra (Sebeș), a river in Sibiu and Alba Counties, Romania
 Dobra, a tributary of the Lișava in Caraș-Severin County, Romania
 Dobra, a tributary of the Valea Caselor in Sibiu County, Romania
 Dobra, a tributary of the Lotru in Vâlcea County, Romania

Other uses
 Battle of Dobra (1863)
 São Tomé and Príncipe dobra, the currency of São Tomé and Príncipe

See also
 Döbra (disambiguation)
 Dobrá (disambiguation)
 Dobra Bridge (disambiguation)
 Dobre (disambiguation)
 Dobro (disambiguation)
 Gmina Dobra (disambiguation)